Ernst Maurits Henricus Hirsch Ballin (born 15 December 1950) is a retired Dutch politician of the Christian Democratic Appeal (CDA) party and jurist. 

After the election of 1989 Hirsch Ballin was appointed as Minister of Justice in the Cabinet Lubbers III, taking office on 7 November 1989. Hirsch Ballin was also appointed as Minister for Netherlands Antilles and Aruba Affairs, taking office on 14 November 1989. Hirsch Ballin served as acting Minister of the Interior from 10 January 1994 until 18 January 1994 following the death of Ien Dales. Hirsch Ballin was elected as a Member of the House of Representatives after the election of 1994, taking office on 17 May 1994. On 27 May 1994 Hirsch Ballin and Minister of the Interior Ed van Thijn resigned following the conclusions of a parliamentary inquiry report into illegal interrogation techniques used by the police. Hirsch Ballin also served again as a professor of International law at the Tilburg University from 1 July 1994 until 22 September 2006 and also as a professor of Jurisprudence at the Tilburg University from 1 September 1996 until 22 September 2006. Hirsch Ballin was elected as a Member of the Senate after the Senate election of 1995, he resigned as a Member of the House of Representatives on 1 June 1995 and was installed as a Member of the Senate, taking office on 13 June 1995. In October 2000 Hirsch Ballin was nominated as Member of the Council of State, he resigned as a Member of the Senate the same day he was installed as a Member of the Council of State, taking office on 1 November 2000. Hirsch Ballin was appointed again as Minister of Justice in the Cabinet Balkenende III following the resignation of Piet Hein Donner, taking office on 22 September 2006. Shortly thereafter Hirsch Ballin announced that he would not stand for the election of 2006. Following the cabinet formation of 2006 Hirsch Ballin continued as Minister of Justice in the Cabinet Balkenende IV, taking office on 22 February 2007. The Cabinet Balkenende IV fell on 20 February 2010 after tensions in the coalition over the extension of the Dutch involvement in the Task Force Urozgan of the International Security Assistance Force (ISAF) in Afghanistan and continued to serve in a demissionary capacity with Hirsch Ballin continuing as Minister of Justice and also took over as Minister of the Interior and Kingdom Relations, taking office on 23 February 2010. In April 2010 Hirsch Ballin announced that he would not stand for the election of 2010. Following the cabinet formation of 2010 Hirsch Ballin was not giving a cabinet post in the new cabinet, the Cabinet Balkenende IV was replaced by the Cabinet Rutte I on 14 October 2010.

Hirsch Ballin semi-retired from active politics and became active in the public sector and occupied numerous seats as a nonprofit director on several boards of directors and supervisory boards (Institute for Multiparty Democracy, European Christian Political Foundation, The Hague Institute for Global Justice, Carnegie Foundation, T.M.C. Asser Instituut, National Archives, Cordaid and the Anne Frank Foundation) and served on several state commissions and councils on behalf of the government (Scientific Council for Government Policy, the Dutch Probation Agency and Public Pension Funds APB) and as an advocate and lobbyist for human rights, anti-war movement, social justice, and democracy. Hirsch Ballin also returned as a distinguished professor of constitutional law and European law at the Tilburg University since 1 April 2011 and as a distinguished professor of human rights at the University of Amsterdam since 1 May 2011. Hirsch Ballin is also a prolific author, having written more than sixty books since 1979 about politics, democracy, and law.

Hirsch Ballin is known for his abilities as a manager and policy wonk.

Biography

Early life
Hirsch Ballin was born to a Jewish father Prof. Dr. Ernst Danny Hirsch Ballin, and a Roman Catholic mother. After completing his secondary education, he studied law at the University of Amsterdam and became a practicing Catholic.

He graduated in 1974, and he received a Master of Laws degree. He received a Doctor of Philosophy degree in 1979 for his dissertation on public law and policy, which focussed on fundamental issues surrounding the work of the Advisory Council on Government Policy (WRR).

Hirsch Ballin was a research assistant in constitutional law at the University of Amsterdam from 1974 to 1977. He was subsequently employed as a legal officer at the Ministry of Justice. In 1981 he was appointed professor of constitutional and administrative law at Tilburg University.

Politics

From 7 November 1989 to 27 May 1994 Hirsch Ballin served as Minister of Justice and Minister for Suriname and Netherlands Antilles Affairs in the Cabinet Lubbers III. In 1994 he offered his resignation, after turmoil about the Dutch Criminal Investigation Department.

After the Cabinet Kok I with a coalition of the Dutch Labour Party, People's Party for Freedom and Democracy and Democrats 66 came to power the Christian Democratic Appeal was pushed to the opposition and Hirsch Ballin became a Member of the House of Representatives a post he held until 1995.

During this period he was also professor of legislative issues at the Tilburg University. In 1995 he was appointed professor of international law at the same university and later became Member of the Senate. He was elected as a member of the Royal Netherlands Academy of Arts and Sciences in 2005. In 2000 Hirsch Ballin was appointed to the Dutch Council of State and he resigned as a Member of the Senate.

Hirsch Ballin has held numerous other positions, among them government commissioner for the review of legislation, member of the Board of the Netherlands Atlantic Association, member of Committee 2004 (for the relationship between the Netherlands, the Netherlands Antilles and Aruba) and deputy justice on the Central Appeals Tribunal and the Administrative Court for Trade and Industry. He has been editor of the Dutch administrative law journal "Nederlands Tijdschrift voor Bestuursrecht" and the book series European and International Law.

On 23 May 2008 satirical cartoonist Gregorius Nekschot was arrested which caused (inter)national controversy. Hirsch Ballin wanted to pass a bill on blasphemy, but failed. He was accused of causing the cartoonist to be brought to court for blasphemy to get a verdict to bypass the parliament.

Hirsch Ballin is also an active member of the Justice Leadership Initiative.

Family
Ernst Hirsch Ballin is married; he and his wife have two children.

Decorations

References

External links

Official
  Prof.Mr.Dr. E.M.H. (Ernst) Hirsch Ballin Parlement & Politiek
  Prof.Mr.Dr. E.M.H. Hirsch Ballin (CDA) Eerste Kamer der Staten-Generaal

 

 

1950 births
Living people
Christian Democratic Appeal politicians
Converts to Roman Catholicism from Judaism
Dutch academic administrators
Dutch democracy activists
Dutch human rights activists
Dutch lobbyists
Dutch magazine editors
Dutch people of German-Jewish descent
Dutch political writers
Dutch Roman Catholics
Dutch scholars of constitutional law
European Union law scholars
Grand Officers of the Order of Leopold II
Grand Officers of the Order of Orange-Nassau
Jewish Dutch politicians
Jewish Dutch writers
Jewish educators
Knights of the Holy Sepulchre
International law scholars
Jurisprudence academics
Knights of the Order of the Netherlands Lion
Members of the Council of State (Netherlands)
Members of the House of Representatives (Netherlands)
Members of the Royal Netherlands Academy of Arts and Sciences
Members of the Scientific Council for Government Policy
Members of the Senate (Netherlands)
Ministers of Kingdom Relations of the Netherlands
Ministers of Justice of the Netherlands
Ministers of the Interior of the Netherlands
Officiers of the Légion d'honneur
Politicians from Amsterdam
Scholars of administrative law
Academic staff of Tilburg University
University of Amsterdam alumni
Academic staff of the University of Amsterdam
20th-century Dutch civil servants
20th-century Dutch jurists
20th-century Dutch male writers
20th-century Dutch politicians
21st-century Dutch civil servants
21st-century Dutch jurists
21st-century Dutch male writers
21st-century Dutch politicians